Busfield is an English surname. Notable people with the surname include:

David Busfield (born 1953), English rugby league player
Joan Busfield (born 1940), British sociologist and psychologist
Timothy Busfield (born 1957), American actor and television director
William Busfield (1773–1851), English politician

English-language surnames